This list of largest United States public university campuses by enrollment includes only individual four-year campuses, not four-year universities.  Universities can have multiple campuses with a single administration.

What this list includes:
A single individual campus with a single physical location of a four-year public university within the United States. On-campus and in person based class enrollment. 
Enrollment is the sum of the headcount of undergraduate and graduate students.
Enrollment is counted by the 21st-day headcount, as provided to the United States Department of Education under the Common Data Set program.
Campuses that have small secondary physical locations that are not reported separately (for extended education, outreach, etc.) are indicated with a footnote.

What this list does not include:
University systems, or universities that have multiple physical campuses.

Not all enrollment counts are directly comparable. See notes. For other lists that measure university enrollment, see the see also section below.

2022–23 enrollment

2021–22 enrollment

2020–21 enrollment

2019–20 enrollment

2018–19 enrollment

2017–18 enrollment

2016–17 enrollment

2015–16 enrollment

2013–14 enrollment

2012–13 enrollment

2011–12 enrollment

2010–11 enrollment

2009–10 enrollment

See also

 World's largest universities
 List of largest United States universities by enrollment
 List of largest United States universities by undergraduate enrollment

Notes

References

External links
National Center for Educational Statistics Enrollment Graph 2002
National Center for Educational Statistics Enrollment Graph 2004
National Center for Education Statistics Enrollment Graph 2005

Enrollment
university campuses
Statistics of education